California Proposition 51 may refer to:

 California Proposition 51 (2002)
 California Proposition 51 (2016)